Ornipholidotos mathildae is a butterfly in the family Lycaenidae. It is found in Cameroon and the Central African Republic. The habitat consists of forests.

Subspecies
 Ornipholidotos mathildae mathildae (Cameroon)
 Ornipholidotos mathildae uniformis Libert, 2005 (Central African Republic)

References

Butterflies described in 2000
Taxa named by Michel Libert
Ornipholidotos